Dendropsophus triangulum (common name: triangle treefrog) is a species of frog in the family Hylidae.
It is found in the upper Amazon Basin in Bolivia, western Brazil, Colombia, Ecuador, and Peru.

Dendropsophus triangulum is widespread but generally uncommon. It is most commonly found around temporary ponds in clearings near forest, but can be also found in forests. Breeding takes place in temporary ponds, where the tadpoles develop.

References

triangulum
Amphibians of Bolivia
Amphibians of Brazil
Amphibians of Colombia
Amphibians of Ecuador
Amphibians of Peru
Amphibians described in 1869
Taxa named by Albert Günther
Taxonomy articles created by Polbot